Crocus angustifolius, the cloth-of-gold crocus, is a species of flowering plant in the genus Crocus of the family Iridaceae, native to southern Ukraine and Armenia. The narrow grass-like leaves with silver central stripe appear in late winter or early spring. They are followed by bright yellow fragrant flowers with maroon blotches on the outer petals.

Description
Crocus angustifolius is a herbaceous perennial geophyte growing from a corm. The globose (round but bulging somewhat in the middle) shaped corm has a coarsely reticulated tunic. The flowers are narrow, opening to a funnelform or radiate shape. The golden yellow flowers have glossy red-brown mottling and streaks on the outer surfaces. The flowers bloom while the grass-like leaves are present.

Habitat
Native to the Crimea where it is found growing on hillsides, in juniper woods, and in areas of scrub; flowering occurs from February to March.

Cultivation 
C. angustifolius is widely cultivated, and has gained the Royal Horticultural Society's Award of Garden Merit.
The cultivar 'Minor' has smaller, attractive darker flowers and blooms a little later than the species. The leaves are also more upright. It is winter hardy to USDA zone 5.

References

angustifolius
Flora of Ukraine
Flora of Armenia